Losey is a surname. Notable people with the surname include:

Brian L. Losey, Rear Admiral, U.S. Navy; Commander, Combined Joint Task Force - Horn of Africa
Frank H. Losey (1872–1931), musician, composer, and arranger of band and orchestra music
Greg Losey (1950–2002), American pentathlete
Joseph Losey (1909–1984), American theater and film director
Gavrik Losey (born 1938), son of Joseph, film producer and production manager
Luke Losey (born 1968), son of Gavrik, film director, lighting designer and photographer
Marek Losey (born 1971), son of Gavrik, British-American film director and the third generation of film maker in the Losey family
Robert M. Losey (1908–1940), aeronautical meteorologist, considered first U.S. military casualty in World War II
Michael R. Losey (1938 -), President of MikeLosey.com; Retired President & CEO of the Society for Human Resource Management (SHRM), and author.

See also
Given name
Losey Army Airfield, former U.S. Army Air Forces air base, Puerto Rico

Other
 Losee (disambiguation)